Prince Bayaya (Czech: Bajaja) is a 1950 Czechoslovak animated film directed by Jiří Trnka.

Awards
1954 Locarno International Film Festival
Won: Golden Leopard

References

External links

1950 animated films
1950 films
Films based on works by Božena Němcová
Films directed by Jiří Trnka
Golden Leopard winners
Czechoslovak animated films
Marionette films
Czech animated films
1950s fantasy adventure films
Czech fantasy adventure films
Films about dragons
Films based on fairy tales
1950s Czech-language films
1950s Czech films
Czech animated adventure films
Czech animated fantasy films